Caesar Uyesaka Stadium is a baseball stadium in Santa Barbara, California.  It is the home field of the UC Santa Barbara Gauchos baseball team as well as the Santa Barbara Foresters.

History
The stadium known simply as "Campus Diamond" or "Campus Stadium" opened in 1964, and underwent a major renovation and expansion after the 1993 college baseball season ended.  The stadium was renamed for the late Caesar Uyesaka, a Santa Barbara resident and dedicated UCSB booster.  The first game was hosted at Caesar Uyesaka Stadium on 5 February 1994 in a contest between UC Santa Barbara and the University of San Diego Toreros. UCSB won the game, 10–4.

A unique baseball venue
The stadium is designed with two levels, one on top of the other, where all seating is directly behind home plate.  It offers a unique view in that the seats are "field level" and under the shade of the seating deck above it.  The seating does not stretch past first or third base.  There is no established seating in the outfield, although occasionally students stand behind the outfield fences.

With Santa Barbara's Mediterranean climate, Caesar Uyesaka Stadium is a popular destination for students and the community alike in the spring and summer. The Santa Ynez Mountains can be seen beyond the outfield fence and southerly ocean breezes from the Pacific Ocean can be felt. The prevailing breeze off the ocean blows toward the outfield and makes the stadium a hitter-friendly park, despite the fact its outfield fences are farther than many major league ballparks.

The Hammerheads
Under coach Al Ferrer, UCSB improved its program in the late 1970s and 1980s.  Along with this improvement came larger and more enthusiastic crowds.  A group of students began taking the cardboard boxes given out at the concession stands to carry food and wore them sideways on their heads.  Eventually this practice spread and the student section of rowdy supporters became known as the "hammerheads", after the distinctive look of hammerhead sharks.

Renovations
To accommodate the strain of hosting two baseball teams, Caesar Uyesaka Stadium has undergone many upgrades to provide an enjoyable experience to the crowds.  Recent upgrades since 2006 include a  clubhouse (including lockers and showers) and covered hitting/pitching facility.

The upgrades, however, have not brought Caesar Uyesaka up to minimum standards to host an NCAA Division I baseball tournament regional or super regional tournament. The stadium lacks an adequate press facilities and the capacity is short of what the NCAA desires for a host site. UCSB hosted a 2015 regional at the Lake Elsinore Diamond in Riverside County, a drive which often takes more than three hours and is routed through Glendale and Pasadena, among other locales. 

Lights were added to the stadium prior to the 2020 season. The first night game at Caesar Uyesaka was played on 17 February 2020, with UCSB defeating the Cal Bears 17–7.

See also
 List of NCAA Division I baseball venues

References

 

College baseball venues in the United States
UC Santa Barbara Gauchos baseball
University of California, Santa Barbara buildings and structures
Baseball venues in California
1964 establishments in California
Sports venues completed in 1964